The Katzie First Nation or Katzie Nation is the band government of the Katzie people of the Lower Fraser Valley region of British Columbia, Canada.

Indian Reserves

The Katzie Nation manages the affairs of residents of five reserves assigned to the Katzie, focused on the area of Pitt Meadows, where the band headquarters are located. Other reserves are on Barnston Island and at Yorkson Creek in Langley, British Columbia.  These reserves are:
Katzie 1, one mile west of Port Hammond on right (north) bank of the Fraser River, 44.10 ha.
Katzie 2, opposite Port Hammond on the left (south) bank of the Fraser River, 23.10 ha.
Barnston Island 3, south shore of Barnston Island, 54.6 ha.
Pitt Lake 4, at south end of Pitt Lake, at outlet into Pitt River, 218.50 ha.
Graveyard 5, one mile north of Port Hammond, 0.40 ha.

Population
As of December 2015, the band's population was 568, of whom 323 live on-reserve.

Treaty Process
The Katzie Nation are negotiating their land treaty independently, and are not part of either Sto:lo tribal councils (the Sto:lo Nation and the Stó:lō Tribal Council).

Golden Ears Bridge agreement
As the new Golden Ears Bridge was in Katzie territory, the nation signed a Benefit Agreement with Translink in September 2004 to establish the responsibilities of both parties.

References

External links
History of the Katzie people, Maple Ridge history website
Katzie First Nation website

First Nations governments in the Lower Mainland
Sto:lo governments
Pitt Meadows